Eden Cemetery may refer to:

Eden Memorial Park Cemetery, Mission Hills, California
Eden Cemetery (Collingdale, Pennsylvania), listed on the National Register of Historic Places in Delaware County, Pennsylvania